Hopea jacobi is a critically endangered species of plant in the family Dipterocarpaceae. It is endemic to the Western Ghats of Kodagu district in Karnataka, India.

References

jacobi
Endemic flora of India (region)
Flora of Karnataka
Critically endangered flora of Asia
Taxonomy articles created by Polbot